HMS Devonshire was a 74-gun third rate ship of the line of the Royal Navy, launched on 23 September 1812 at Deptford.

She was placed on harbour service in 1849, and was broken up in 1869.

Notes

References

Lavery, Brian (2003) The Ship of the Line - Volume 1: The development of the battlefleet 1650-1850. Conway Maritime Press. .

Ships of the line of the Royal Navy
Vengeur-class ships of the line
Ships built in Deptford
1812 ships